SS Ouse was a passenger and freight vessel built for the Goole Steam Shipping Company in 1884.

History

She was described in the Shields Daily Gazette of 12 July 1884 as constructed with a topgallant forecastle fitted for the crew, long bridge house extending over the engine and boiler room, and poop which will be handsomely fitted up for the comfortable accommodation of first-class passengers. The machinery [was to be] supplied by R and W Hawthorn, and will develop 600 hp, being greatly in excess of that usually fitted. All modern appliances have been provided for the rapid dispatch in loading and unloading cargo, special winches having been prepared to the company’s own design, as also has the steering gear.

In 1905 she was acquired by the Lancashire and Yorkshire Railway. In 1910 she was sold to Angfartygs Aktiebolag Transito (H Wilen), Abo and renamed Goole Trader. In 1927 she was purchased by Th Kramer, Abo, and two years later in 1929 by Pargas Kalkbergs Aktiebolag, Paragas. She was renamed Tervsund.

She was wrecked on 13 September 1947 near Varberg on a voyage from Landskrona to Middlesbrough.

References

1884 ships
Steamships of the United Kingdom
Ships built on the River Tyne
Ships of the Lancashire and Yorkshire Railway